Bülent Ertuğrul (born September 17, 1978) is a Turkish football player who last played for Denizlispor in defender position. He played in Nazilli Belediyespor in 1999/2000 season.

External links
 Profile at TFF.org 
 Profile at futbolig.com.tr 

1979 births
Living people
Turkish footballers
Eskişehirspor footballers
Denizlispor footballers
Sportspeople from Denizli
Süper Lig players
Elazığspor footballers
Association football defenders 
Association football midfielders